Băiuș is a commune in Leova District, Moldova. It is composed of three villages: Băiuș, Cociulia Nouă and Hîrtop.

References

Communes of Leova District